Cardinal or The Cardinal may refer to:

Animals 
 Cardinal (bird) or Cardinalidae, a family of North and South American birds
Cardinalis, genus of cardinal in the family Cardinalidae
Cardinalis cardinalis, or northern cardinal, the common cardinal of eastern North America
 Argynnis pandora, a species of butterfly
 Cardinal tetra, a freshwater fish
 Paroaria, a South American genus of birds, called red-headed cardinals or cardinal-tanagers

Businesses
 Cardinal Brewery, a brewery founded in 1788 by François Piller, located in Fribourg, Switzerland
 Cardinal Health, a health care services company

Christianity 
 Cardinal (Catholic Church), a senior official of the Catholic Church
Member of the College of Cardinals
 Cardinal (Church of England), either of two members of the College of Minor Canons of St. Paul's Cathedral

Entertainment

Films
 Cardinals (film), a 2017 Canadian film
 The Cardinal (1936 film), a British historical drama
 The Cardinal, a 1963 American film

Games
 Cardinal (chess), a fairy chess piece, also known as the archbishop
 Cardinal, a participant in the army drinking game Cardinal Puff

Music

Groups
 Cardinal (band), indie pop duo formed in 1992
 The Cardinals (rock band), a group formed in 2003
 The Cardinals, a 1950s R&B group

Albums
 Cardinal (Cardinal album), 1994
 Cardinal (Pinegrove album), 2016

Television
 Cardinal (TV series), a 2017 Canadian television series
 "Cardinal" (The Americans), the second episode of the second season of the television series The Americans

Other arts, entertainment, and media
 Cardinal (comics), a supervillain appearing in Marvel Comics
 The Cardinal (play), a 1641 Caroline era tragedy by James Shirley
 The Cardinal System, a system appearing in the Sword Art Online series
 Cardinal, a stormtrooper officer featured in Star Wars: Phasma, a novel by Delilah S. Dawson

Linguistics
 Cardinal numeral, a part of speech for expressing numbers by name
 Cardinal vowel, a concept in phonetics

Mathematics
 Cardinal number
 Large cardinal

Navigation
 Cardinal direction, one of the four primary directions: north, south, east, and west
 Cardinal mark, a sea mark used in navigation

Places
 Cardinal, Manitoba, Canada
 Cardinal, Ontario, Canada
 Cardinal High School (Middlefield, Ohio), a public high school in Middlefield, Ohio, Geauga County, United States
 Cardinal Mountain, a summit in California
 Cardinal Power Plant, a power plant in Jefferson County, Ohio
 Cardinal, Virginia, United States
 C/2008 T2 (Cardinal), a comet

Plants
 Cardinal (grape), a table grape first produced in California in 1939
 Lobelia cardinalis, also known as "cardinal flower"

Sports
 Arizona Cardinals, an American professional football team
 Assindia Cardinals, an American football club from Essen, Germany
 Ball State Cardinals, the athletic teams of Ball State University
 Cardenales de Lara, a Venezuelan baseball team
 Catholic University Cardinals, the athletic teams of the Catholic University of America
 Front Royal Cardinals, an American baseball team
Incarnate Word Cardinals, the athletic teams of the University of the Incarnate Word
 Lamar Cardinals, the athletic teams of Lamar University in Beaumont, Texas, USA
 Louisville Cardinals, the athletic teams of University of Louisville
 Mapúa Cardinals, the athletic teams of Mapúa Institute of Technology
 North Central Cardinals, the athletic teams of North Central College
  St. John Fisher Cardinals, the athletic teams of St. John Fisher College in Rochester, NY
 St. Louis Cardinals, an American professional baseball team
 Stanford Cardinal, the athletic teams of Stanford University; named for the color but not the bird
 Wesleyan Cardinals, the athletic teams of Wesleyan University
 West Perth Football Club, an Australian rules football club in Western Australia
 Woking F.C., an English football team

Transport

Aircraft
 Cessna 177 Cardinal, a single engine aircraft
 St. Louis Cardinal C-2-110, a light aircraft built in 1928
 NCSIST Cardinal, a family of small UAVs

Trains
 Cardinal (train)
 The Cardinal (railcar)

Other uses
 Cardinal (color), a vivid red
 Cardinal (name), a surname
 Cardinal, a Ruby programming language implementation using for the Parrot virtual machine

See also
 Cardenal, a surname
 Cardinal sin or cardinal syn
 Cardinale, a surname